The 31st Wisconsin Infantry Regiment was a volunteer infantry regiment that served in the Union Army during the American Civil War.

Service
The 31st Wisconsin was organized at Prairie du Chien and Racine, Wisconsin, and mustered into Federal service December 24, 1862.

Companies A-F were mustered out on June 20, 1865.  Companies G-K followed on July 8, 1865.

Casualties
The 31st Wisconsin suffered 23 enlisted men killed in action or who later died of their wounds, plus another 3 officers and 86 enlisted men who died of disease, for a total of 112 fatalities.

Commanders
 Colonel Isaac E. Messmore (August 28, 1862October 2, 1863) resigned.  Before the war he was a Wisconsin legislator and judge.
 Colonel Francis H. West (October 8, 1863June 20, 1865) was originally lieutenant colonel of the regiment.  He received an honorary brevet to brigadier general.  Before the war he served in the Wisconsin State Senate, after the war, he served in the Assembly and was appointed U.S. marshal for the Eastern District of Wisconsin.

Majors
Robert B. Sevenson

Captains
Company A: Henry A. Chase

Company B: Nathaniel B. Treat

Company C: Ira D. Burdick

Company D: Ornsby B. Thomas

Company E: Daniel B. Dibble

Company F: Charles W. Burns

Company G: Farlin Q. Ball

Company H: Edward K. Buttrick

Company I: John B. Vliet

Company K: Edwin Augustus Bottum

See also

 List of Wisconsin Civil War units
 Wisconsin in the American Civil War

Notes

References
The Civil War Archive
 Message of the Governor of Wisconsin Together with the Annual Reports 1863

Military units and formations established in 1862
Military units and formations disestablished in 1865
Units and formations of the Union Army from Wisconsin
1862 establishments in Wisconsin